The 1971 Volta a Catalunya was the 51st edition of the Volta a Catalunya cycle race and was held from 14 to 19 September 1971. The race started in Calafell and finished in Badalona. The race was won by Luis Ocaña of the  team.

General classification

References

1971
Volta
1971 in Spanish road cycling
September 1971 sports events in Europe